Jinka is a market town in southern Ethiopia. Located in the hills north of the Tama Plains, this town is the capital of the Debub Omo Zone of the Southern Nations, Nationalities, and Peoples Region. Currently Jinka is the center of Jinka town administration. It is one of the most famous tourist destinations in the country. It is also an important center for at least sixteen indigenous ethnic groups as well as others from the rest of the country.

Overview 
Jinka is home to the German-funded South-Omo Museum and Research Center and an airstrip (IATA code BCO). Postal service is provided by a main branch; electricity and telephone service are also available. Its market day is Saturday. The Mago National Park, 40 kilometers south by unpaved road, is a nearby attraction.

The local clinic was reported in 1996 to be in the process of upgrading to hospital status, which would become the first in the Zone. According to the SNNPR's Bureau of Finance and Economic Development,  Jinka's amenities include digital telephone access, postal service, electricity provided by a diesel generator, a bank and a hospital. Jinka increased its electrical service from 16 to 24 hours a day in May 2009 when the town obtained additional generators.

Demographics 
Based on figures from the Central Statistical Agency in 2005, Jinka has an estimated total population of 22,475 of whom 11,774 are men and 10,701 are women. Previous population figures vary: the 1994 national census reported this town had a total population of 12,407 of whom 6,519 were men and 5,888 were women; another source states in 1993 there were a total of 9,520 inhabitants.

Notes 

Populated places in the Southern Nations, Nationalities, and Peoples' Region
Ethiopia
Cities and towns in Ethiopia